Curtitoma georgоssiani is a species of sea snails, a marine gastropod mollusc in the family Mangeliidae.

Description

Distribution
This marine species occurs in the Barents Sea.

References

 Merkuljev A.V. (2017). Taxonomic puzzle of Propebela arctica (A. Adams, 1855) (Gastropoda, Mangeliidae) - six different species under single name. Ruthenica. 27(1): 15–30

External links

georgоssiani
Gastropods described in 2017